is a Japanese satellite broadcasting station headquartered in Akasaka Gochome, Minato, Tokyo. Its channel name is BS-TBS (formerly, BS-i). It is a member television station of Japan News Network.

Channels
Television: BS-TBS is assigned BS161ch - 163ch.
Radio: BS-i had been assigned 461ch, 462ch, and was closed on September 30, 2005. - TBS Radio & Communications had been produced.
Data: BS-TBS is assigned BS766ch, BS768ch, but BS768ch is not being used now.

History

November, 1998 -  founded.
June, 2000 - JDC was renamed .
December 1, 2000 - BS-i started broadcasting.
July, 2004 - BS-i moved its headquarters from TBS Hoso Kaikan to TBS Broadcast Center 15th fl.
September 30, 2005 - BS-i closed satellite radio broadcasting.
April 1, 2009 - BS-i, Incorporated was renamed to its current name BS-TBS, Incorporated.

Programs
General programs
A number of programs which TBS broadcasts are also broadcast on BS-TBS.
Anime programs
Anime produced by BS-TBS are popular among anime fans because the regulation of expression on satellite broadcasting is looser than on terrestrial broadcasting. 
On TBS, in order to adjust size, most 16:9 anime is cropped on the left and right. They are broadcast on BS-TBS in their original form.
These are anime programs exclusively broadcast on BS-TBS:
Air
Cyber Team in Akihabara
Eikoku Koi Monogatari Emma
He Is My Master
Kanon
Little Snow Fairy Sugar
Mahoromatic
Popotan
This Ugly yet Beautiful World
Yumeria
These are anime programs broadcast on both TBS and BS-TBS:
Oh My Goddess!
Bincho-tan
BLACK CAT
Chobits
Heat Guy J
Ichigo Mashimaro
Melody of Oblivion
REC
Rozen Maiden
Rozen Maiden Traumend
Clannad
Clannad -After Story-
Tsukihime, Lunar Legend
K-On!
Sankarea
Acchi Kocchi

See also
Tokyo Broadcasting System
Tokyo Broadcasting System Television
TBS Radio & Communications

External links
BS-TBS Official Website (Japanese)

Tokyo Broadcasting System
Japan News Network
Television stations in Japan
Television channels and stations established in 1998
Television in Tokyo